Clement Throckmorton (c. 1512 – 1573) was an English landowner and Member of Parliament in the middle years of the 16th century.

A member of a distinguished Warwickshire family, son of Sir George Throckmorton and his wife Catherine Vaux (daughter of Nicholas Vaux and Elizabeth FitzHugh) and the brother of the influential diplomat Sir Nicholas Throckmorton and Robert Throckmorton and cousin of Henry VIII's last Queen, Catherine Parr, Throckmorton sat in nine Parliaments between 1542 and 1572, representing Warwick four times and Warwickshire twice as well as three other scattered boroughs (Devizes, Sudbury and West Looe). He also had a successful military record, and was appointed Constable of Kenilworth Castle in 1553, a post he held until his death. He acquired the estate of Haseley in Warwickshire in 1554 from his uncle, who had himself acquired it from the Crown after the attainder of its previous owner, the Duke of Northumberland. He also enhanced his fortune through successful trading, and was a founder member of the Muscovy Company.

Throckmorton was a reliable but moderate Protestant, although one of his brothers remained a Catholic, which cast a shadow of doubt over Clement's allegiances, and he himself was loyal to Queen Mary while she was on the throne. However, his son, Job, was later one of the most active lay supporters of the Puritan opposition, and was deeply involved in the publication of the Marprelate Tracts. He married Katherine Neville, daughter of Sir Edward Neville of Addington and Eleanor Windsor, daughter of Sir Andrew Windsor, 1st Baron Windsor.

Notes

References
 J E Neale, The Elizabethan House of Commons (London: Jonathan Cape, 1949)
 
Victoria County History of Warwickshire, Volume 3: Barlichway hundred, Parishes: Haseley

1510s births
Date of birth unknown
1573 deaths
Clement
16th-century English landowners
People of the Muscovy Company
English MPs 1542–1544
English MPs 1545–1547
English MPs 1547–1552
English MPs 1553 (Edward VI)
English MPs 1553 (Mary I)
English MPs 1559
English MPs 1563–1567
English MPs 1571
English MPs 1572–1583